is a tennis sports video game that was released by Namco in 1988 for Japanese arcades. It runs upon Namco System 1 hardware, and was inspired by the 1987 Famicom game Family Tennis. In August 1988, the game was ported to the PC Engine console, in which a new tennis-based role-playing quest mode was added, and was later ported to the North American TurboGrafx-16 console by NEC under the title of World Court Tennis in 1989. Up to four players could play simultaneously. A sequel named Super World Court was released in 1992, which ran on Namco NA-1 hardware and allowed up to four players to play simultaneously. The arcade version was recently confirmed to be released on the PlayStation 4 and Nintendo Switch as part of the Arcade Archives lineup on May 12, 2022 worldwide.

Gameplay
At the start of the game the players must select either "singles" (Player 1 v Player 2) or "doubles" (Player Team v CPU Team); they must then select one of twenty different players (ten male, eight female and two robot) before selecting one of three different courts (New York City hard, London lawn, and Paris clay). They must then select whether they want the match to be one or three sets long - and, once they have done so, their two (or four) chosen players will come out, and take their positions on the court. The players must use an eight-way joystick to direct their chosen players around their half of the court and two buttons to hit the ball with their rackets; but just like in a real tennis match, faults, net balls and deuce can occur (but the "Deuce" setting in the options menu can be turned off).

Reception
The game received positive reviews from critics. Computer and Video Games magazine reviewed the PC Engine version, rating it 94% in 1989 and stating up to "four players can play simultaneously in this utterly incredible tennis game" with "huge lasting appeal." ACE magazine reviewed the PC Engine version in 1989, rating it 935 out of 1000 and listing it as the third best game available for the console, after R-Type and Final Lap Twin. They said World Tennis was "the PC Engine at its sporting best" and that it "has everything" including "superb graphics, top spin, drop shots, volleys," convincing "3D screen separation" and "an arcade adventure" mode.

See also
Final Lap Twin
Inazuma Eleven
Racing role playing games

Notes

References

1988 video games
Arcade video games
Bandai Namco Entertainment franchises
Namco arcade games
Nintendo Switch games
PlayStation 4 games
Tennis video games
Japan-exclusive video games
X68000 games
TurboGrafx-16 games
Video games developed in Japan

Hamster Corporation games